is a 2015 Japanese youth romance film directed by . It is based on the novel  by Hiro Arikawa. It was released on November 21, 2015.

Plot

Sakisaka Nobuyuki is a salaryman. When he was in middle school student, he read a light novel "Fairy Game”. He still has that light novel, because he was so shocked by the ending. One day, Nobuyuki browses the internet and comes across the blog "Rein Tsuri no Kuni.” He learns that the blog writer, Hitomi Rika, also was shocked by the ending in the light novel "Fairy Game." Nobuyuki and Rika soon begin to exchange emails. Nobuyuki wants to meet Rika, but she refuses due to her secret of being hard of hearing.

Cast
Yuta Tamamori
Mariya Nishiuchi
Kanna Mori

Shigenori Yamazaki

Kenichi Yajima
Yumi Asō
Ren Osugi
Atsuko Takahata

Music

Reception

See also
Showgate 2015 films

References

External links
 

2010s romance films
Films based on Japanese novels
Films directed by Yoshishige Miyake
Japanese romance films
Showgate films
2010s Japanese films